The Barn is a house built by architect A. Quincy Jones in 1950 as his personal home and office. In 2009 Jones' wife sold the house for US$2,000,000 to the Annenberg Foundation, which uses the building as office space and for private events.

Renovation
The Annenberg Foundation hired Frederick Fisher to renovate the building after they acquired it in November 2009. Fisher kept the building nearly original, only updating the ventilation and light fixtures.

References

Modernist architecture in California
Houses in Los Angeles